Hans Daae  (15 October 1865 – 10 December 1926) was a Norwegian physician, military officer and sports official.

Personal life
Daae was born in Kragerø to prison director Anders Daae and Anna Honoria Hansen. He married Anna Helen Alm in 1894.

Career
He graduated as cand.med. in 1890, and was also a military officer. He headed the Norwegian Army's medical service from 1909, and was promoted major general in 1917. He initiated and edited the magazine Norsk Tidsskrift for Militærmedicin. From 1916 to 1920 he chaired the sports association Centralforeningen for utbredelse af idræt. He was decorated Knight, First Class of the Order of St. Olav in 1911, and was a Commander of the Order of the Dannebrog. He died in Oslo in 1926.

References

 

1865 births
1926 deaths
People from Kragerø
Norwegian military doctors
Norwegian magazine editors
Norwegian Army generals
Norwegian sports executives and administrators
Commanders of the Order of the Dannebrog